Gaucher V de Châtillon ( 1249 in Châtillon-sur-Marne – 1329), Lord of Châtillon, Count of Porcien, was constable of Champagne in 1284 and then Constable of France (1302–1329) during the reigns of five different kings. He was also tutor to the future Louis X of France and his primary minister.

Biography 
Gaucher was the son of Gaucher IV de Châtillon and Isabelle de Villehardouin, and was the grandson of Hugues de Châtillon, Count of Blois and Saint-Pol.

In 1284, King Philip III of France named Gaucher, Constable of Champagne. He traded Philip IV for the county of Chatillon in return for Crecy in 1290, however in 1303 Philip forced the return of the county in exchange for Château-Porcien. Gaucher kept the castle of Châtillon, which was reserved for him and his descendants.

In 1291, Gaucher repelled the army of Count Henry III of Bar, son-in-law of King Edward I of England. He fought the English in Guyenne in 1296. In 1302, during the conflict between Pope Boniface VIII and Philip IV, Gaucher tried to convince the nobility that the King of France was only accountable to God.

The Flanders Revolt 
In Flanders in 1302, Gaucher quashed the revolt in Bruges and built in that city a citadel at the expense of the inhabitants. He built two others in Lille and Courtray and fortified several other castles that had been demolished.

In fiction
Châtillon is a character in Les Rois maudits (The Accursed Kings), a series of French historical novels by Maurice Druon. He was played by Jean Chevrier in the 1972 French miniseries adaptation of the series, and by Wadeck Stanczak in the 2005 adaptation.

References

Sources

1249 births
1329 deaths
13th-century French people
14th-century French people
Constables of France
Medieval French nobility
Lords of France